The Église Notre-Dame de l'Assomption (Our Lady of the Assumption Church) is a Roman Catholic parish church of the town of Rouffach in southern Alsace. It is one of the largest medieval churches in the Haut-Rhin département of France. The church is also known as Saint-Arbogast Church (Église Saint-Arbogast).
It lies on the "Route Romane d'Alsace". Although work started in the 11th century and was carried on with interruptions until 1870, the building remains unfinished.

History and architecture 
The church is made of yellow and pink sandstone and was built in the Romanesque and Gothic styles, with Neo-Gothic additions. The oldest part of the building, the transept, dates from the second half of the 11th century; the nave is from the 12th and 13th century and displays both late Romanesque walls and early Gothic side portals; the choir is in late Gothic style. Work on the building both outside and inside continued until 1508; however, the twin-towered façade remained unfinished. A rood screen that had been built around 1300 was demolished in the 18th century and only two lateral staircases remain. Notre-Dame de l'Assomption suffered severe damage during the French Revolution and now appears relatively unadorned on both the outside and the inside. The large-scale volume of the church and the presence of several medieval building styles appear all the more evidently to the visitor. The Church is listed as a Monument historique since 1841 by the French Ministry of Culture. A comprehensive restoration of the building, which was undertaken from 1866 by the French architect Maximilien Émile Mimey, had to be stopped in 1870 because of the outbreak of the Franco-Prussian War. The planned heightening  and completion of the double-towered façade was never carried out. Only the crest of the north tower was completed, in pink Vosges sandstone, in striking colour contrast to the yellow tower base. A sacristy was added to the building after 1918. 

Furnishing 
The great façade portal was vandalized during the French Revolution, when the statues and other sculptures that adorned it were shattered. On the front gable and the clerestory area, as well as on top of the apse, regions too high to be reached by ladder, some sculptures are still to be seen. Inside, some late gothic capitals – among which the "Rouffach smile" (sourire de Rouffach), the smiling heads of a young girl and a young boy facing each other – still testify to the ornamental style employed by some of the church's designers.

Rouffach's main church owns a pipe organ from the year 1855 (a work by Claude-Ignace Callinet) in which some of the pipes from the previous organ, of 1626, are still to be found. These are the oldest still-functioning organ pipes of Alsace. The rose window of the façade (14th century) is, by the number of lancets composing it (20) as well as by overall design, the most complex in Alsace, before the much larger one of Strasbourg Cathedral, which has only 16 lancets. Apart from the baptismal font, the tabernacle and the tombstone of the knight Werner Falk, all three in an ornate Gothic style, the rest of the interior furnishing is mainly Neo-Gothic.

Gallery

References

External links 

Close-up photo of the rose window

Churches in Haut-Rhin
Monuments historiques of Haut-Rhin
11th-century Roman Catholic church buildings in France
Gothic architecture in France
Romanesque architecture in France